The 1972–73 Buffalo Sabres season was the Sabres' third season of operation in the National Hockey League. The team made it to the playoffs for the first time, but lost in the first round to Montreal, four games to two.

Offseason 
The Sabres added future Hall of Fame defenseman Tim Horton in the intra-league draft. In the Amateur Draft, the Sabres picked defenseman Jim Schoenfeld as their first-round pick, fifth over-all.

Regular season

Final standings

Schedule and results

Playoffs 
The 1972–73 season saw the Sabres qualify for the Stanley Cup Playoffs for the first time. The team would ultimately lose to the eventual Stanley Cup Champion Montreal Canadiens in 6 games. After falling behind three games to none the Sabres won two straight to earn a final home game that was memorable for the "Thank you Sabres" chant from the end of the game.

 	

 Scorer of game-winning goal in italics
 *Denotes if necessary

Player statistics 

Note: Pos = Position; GP = Games played; G = Goals; A = Assists; Pts = Points; +/- = plus/minus; PIM = Penalty minutes; PPG = Power-play goals; SHG = Short-handed goals; GWG = Game-winning goals
      MIN = Minutes played; W = Wins; L = Losses; T = Ties; GA = Goals-against; GAA = Goals-against average; SO = Shutouts;

Awards and records 
Lady Byng Memorial Trophy: Gilbert Perreault

Transactions

Trades

Lost via retirement

Claimed via Waivers

Lost via Waivers

Lost in the Expansion Draft

1972 NHL Intraleague Draft

Draft picks

NHL draft

Farm teams 
The 1972–73 AHL season was a successful one for the Sabres' AHL affiliate, the Cincinnati Swords. The Swords would finish first overall in the regular season with a 54–17–5 record. They would go on to win the Calder Cup in the playoffs losing only 3 games in the 3 round best-of-7 event. It would be the only championship won by the team in its short existence.

See also 
 1972–73 NHL season

References 

Buffalo Sabres seasons
Buff
Buff
Buffalo
Buffalo